Joseph Azzolina (January 26, 1926 – April 15, 2010) was an American Republican Party politician who served in the New Jersey Legislature for a total of 24 years. 22 of these years he served in the New Jersey General Assembly while he served two years in the New Jersey Senate, each time representing parts of Monmouth County.

Career
Azzolina was raised in the Borough of Highlands, New Jersey and attended grammar and Atlantic Highlands High School there. His parents were John and Angelina Giaimi Azzolina, who emigrated to the United States from Sicily during the 1920s. He joined the U.S. Navy in 1944 at 18 years old and was later enrolled in ROTC at Drew University. Azzolina left the Active Duty Navy in 1947 to serve in the U.S. Naval Reserves, where he eventually earned the rank of captain. As well as being a politician and businessman, Azzolina also owned The Courier newspaper, in Middletown, which he purchased in 1982 and operated until it closed, in April, 2009.
Azzolina served in the United States Naval Reserve from 1947 to 1986, Captain (ret). As a reservist, he returned to active duty in 1983 for a tour of seven months – four of them off the coast of Lebanon – aboard the battleship USS New Jersey. He received three Meritorious Service Medals and two Navy Secretary Commendation Medals in addition to other combat awards and honors. Assemblyman Azzolina was chairman of the U.S.S. New Jersey Battleship Commission, and led the effort to acquire the retired ship and have it docked in New Jersey waters where it was then transformed into a floating museum.

He also served in the Assembly from 1966 to 1972 and again from 1986 to 1988. Azzolina also served in the upper house of the New Jersey Legislature, the New Jersey Senate, from 1972 to 1973. Azzolina served in the Assembly on the State Government Committee.  He ran for the New Jersey State Senate in 1987, but lost by a very narrow margin.  He also ran for the Congress in 1988, but lost a close race to state Senator Frank Pallone.

Azzolina was defeated in the June 2005 GOP primary, and was replaced in the Assembly by fellow Republican Amy Handlin, who took office on January 10, 2006 when Azzolina's term ended.

As an Assemblyman, Azzolina sponsored legislation to provide a $250 property tax deduction for veterans, and a measure creating a model program in Monmouth County that utilizes specially-trained nurses to provide care for and collect forensic evidence from victims of sexual assault. Another measure sponsored by the assemblyman would create a central registry containing records of all persons who have been charged with a crime or offense involved domestic violence. Under the measure, the records would only be released to law enforcement agencies and the courts. 

Azzolina was born in Newark, New Jersey and was a resident of Middletown Township, New Jersey. He was President of Food Circus Supermarkets, Inc.

He died of pancreatic cancer on April 15, 2010, in Manhattan, New York City New York at age 84. The bridge connecting Sea Bright to Highlands is called the "Captain Joseph Azzolina Memorial Bridge" in his honor.

Education
Azzolina received a B.S. from Holy Cross College in (Naval Science) and attended the New York University Graduate School of Business.

District 13
Each of the forty districts in the New Jersey Legislature has one representative in the New Jersey Senate and two members in the New Jersey General Assembly. The other representatives from the 13th District for the 2004–05 Legislative Session were:

Assemblyman Samuel D. Thompson, and
Senator Joseph M. Kyrillos

References

External links
, New Jersey Legislature
New Jersey Voter Information Website 2003
New Jersey Legislature financial disclosure form for 2004 (PDF)

1926 births
2010 deaths
Deaths from cancer in New York (state)
Deaths from pancreatic cancer
Republican Party members of the New Jersey General Assembly
Republican Party New Jersey state senators
New York University Stern School of Business alumni
People from Middletown Township, New Jersey
Politicians from Monmouth County, New Jersey
Politicians from Newark, New Jersey
American grocers
21st-century American politicians
United States Navy personnel of World War II
United States Navy officers
United States Navy reservists
Military personnel from New Jersey